The Dumfries Vikings are a defunct professional ice hockey team based in Dumfries, Scotland, which played in the British Hockey League from 1993 to 1996 (playing their final season as the Dumfries Border Vikings).

References

Ice hockey teams in Scotland
Ice hockey clubs established in 1993
Sports clubs disestablished in 1996
1993 establishments in Scotland
1996 disestablishments in Scotland